Rosemary Ellis née Collinson  (1910–1998) was a British artist, graphic designer and teacher known for her poster and book jacket designs.

Biography
Ellis was born in London and from 1927 to 1931 attended the art school of the Regent Street Polytechnic in central London. At art school she met her husband, Clifford Ellis, the couple married in 1931 and would frequently collaborate on art projects together. During the 1930s they produced more than twenty posters for London Transport, often using surrealist motifs, such as in the 1937 poster Travels in time on your doorstep. They also designed posters for the General Post Office, BP, the Empire Marketing Board plus a series of 16 lithographs for J Lyons & Co restaurants. Starting in 1934 they designed the 'Professions' series of posters for Shell-Mex & BP including, for example, Anglers Prefer Shell. They also worked together on book jackets, murals and mosaics, signing their work with the monogram C&RE to reflect their joint and equal involvement.

From 1938 onwards, Rosemary Ellis taught art at the Royal School for Daughters of Officers of the Army in Bath while Clifford Ellis held a succession of posts at the Bath Academy of Art, where Rosemary would also teach a variety of subjects. During World War Two, Rosemary worked for the Recording Britain project, depicting architectural scenes in Bath. In 1946 the Ellises designed the entrance and a mural to the Britain Can Make It exhibition at the Victoria & Albert Museum. Between 1945 and 1982 they designed a total of 86 covers and dust jackets for the New Naturalist series of books and monographs published by Collins.

The British Museum, the London Transport Museum and the Victoria & Albert Museum hold examples of Ellis' designs. The Victoria Art Gallery and Bath Record Office hold archives of Ellis' papers and designs.

References

External links
 Works by Rosemary and Clifford Ellis in the London Transport Museum collection

1910 births
1998 deaths
20th-century English painters
20th-century English women artists
Alumni of the Regent Street Polytechnic
Artists from London
British poster artists
English illustrators
English women painters